The UWA World Heavyweight Championship (Campeonato Mundial peso Completo de UWA in Spanish) was a professional wrestling world heavyweight championship originally promoted by Universal Wrestling Association (UWA) until it closed in 1995. After UWA's closure, the title was sporadically, unofficially defended on the Mexican independent circuit. In the past the title has been defended in Consejo Mundial de Lucha Libre (CMLL) and Asistencia Asesoría y Administración (AAA) when the champion worked for those companies. Lou Thez was the first UWA World Heavyweight champion, having been awarded the title after wrestling Mil Mascaras to a draw on the very first UWA show. El Canek has held the Championship the most times, 15 reigns all in all, 13 of those before the UWA closed. Canek is also the one that kept the championship active after the UWA closed, defending it on the independent circuit. Dr. Wagner, Jr. was the final UWA World Heavyweight champion having defeated Canek on June 18, 2004. During Dr. Wagner, Jr's time in AAA, they sometimes acknowledged the title, having had shown him with the belt on numerous occasions.

As it was a professional wrestling championship, the championship was not won not by actual competition, but by a scripted ending to a match determined by the bookers and match makers. On occasion the promotion declares a championship vacant, which means there is no champion at that point in time. This can either be due to a storyline, or real life issues such as a champion suffering an injury being unable to defend the championship, or leaving the company.

Title history

Combined reigns 

{| class="wikitable sortable" style="text-align: center"
!Rank
!Wrestler
!No. ofreigns
!Combineddays
|-
!1
|   || 15 ||style="background-color:#bbeeff"| 7,086¤
|-
!2
| Dr. Wagner Jr. || 1 || 2,667
|-
!3
| Big Van Vader || 1 || 382
|-
!4
| Lou Thesz || 1 || 377
|-
!5
| Canadian Vampire Casanova || 1 || 322
|-
!6
| Cibernético  || 1 || 299
|-
!7
| Dos Caras || 3 || style="background-color:#bbeeff"| 273¤
|-
!8
| Antonio Inoki || 1 || 194
|-
!9
| Tiger Jeet Singh || 2 || 170
|-
!10
| Enrique Vera || 1 || 126
|-
!11
| Riki Choshu || 1 || 65
|-
!12
| Perro Aguayo || 1 || 62
|-
!13
| Scorpio || 1 || 61
|-
!14
| Tatsumi Fujinami || 1 || 42
|-
!15
| Cadaver de Ultratumba || 1 || 22
|-
!16
| Yamato || 1 || 4
|-
!17
| The Killer || 1 ||style="background-color:#bbeeff"| N/A¤
|-

Footnotes

References

Universal Wrestling Association championships
World heavyweight wrestling championships
World professional wrestling championships